Mylochromis labidodon is a species of cichlid endemic to Lake Malawi and Lake Malombe.  This species can reach a length of  TL.  This species can also be found in the aquarium trade.

References

labidodon
Fish described in 1935
Taxonomy articles created by Polbot